Message 01 is Minori Chihara's PV (promotion video, better known as music videos) DVD. It also includes a bonus follow-up track to the album Contact on a separate CD as well as material related to the promotion of her career in the DVD.

Contents
PV

History Documentary
Events prior to the release of Contact: "Grateful Days"
Commercials
One version for Kimi ga Kureta Anohi.
Three versions for Contact.
Two versions for Message 01.
Promotional commercial: "Tokuhou"
Bonus (CD)
Follow-up thirteenth track to Contact: "Contact 13th"

References

External links
 Minori Chihara Official Website
 Message 01 @ lantis.jp

2007 albums
Lantis (company)
Minori Chihara albums